Leynar is a village in the Faroe Islands, a self-governing overseas administrative division of Denmark.

The village is situated on the western coast of the island of Streymoy in the municipality of Kvívíkar. It has a population of 112 (August 2022). Leynar is the birthplace of Faroese actor Sverri Egholm (1930–2001) and domicile of the poet Guðrið Helmsdal.

See also
 List of towns in the Faroe Islands

External links
A Danish website including  photographs of Leynar

References

Populated places in the Faroe Islands